Telmatherium is a genus of a North American Brontothere. It lived during the Eocene epoch.

References

Brontotheres
Eocene mammals of North America
Eocene odd-toed ungulates